was a short-lived province located in Hokkaidō.  It corresponded to the southern part of today's Oshima and Hiyama Subprefectures

History
After 1869, the northern Japanese island was known as Hokkaido; and regional administrative subdivisions were identified, including Oshima Province.
August 15, 1869 Oshima Province established with seven districts
1872 Census reports 75,830 inhabitants of the province
July, 1881 Tsugaru District and Fukushima District merged to form Matsumae District, reducing the number of districts to six.
1882 Provinces dissolved in Hokkaidō.

Districts
Kameda (亀田郡, -gun))
Kayabe (茅部郡)
Kamiiso (上磯郡)
Fukushima (福島郡), merged with Tsugaru District in 1881 to form Matsumae District
Tsugaru (津軽郡), merged with Fukushima District in 1881 to form Matsumae District
Hiyama (檜山郡)
Nishi (爾志郡)

Notes

References
 Nussbaum, Louis-Frédéric and Käthe Roth. (2005).  Japan encyclopedia. Cambridge: Harvard University Press. ;  OCLC 58053128

Former provinces of Japan